The 2000 Cronulla-Sutherland Sharks season was the 34th in the club's history. They competed in the NRL's 2000 Telstra Premiership.

Ladder

Results

References

Cronulla-Sutherland Sharks seasons
Cronulla-Sutherland Sharks season